The Asian American Literary Awards are a set of annual awards that have been presented by The Asian American Writers' Workshop since 1998. The awards include a set of honors for excellence in fiction, poetry and nonfiction, chosen by a panel of literary and academic judges; a Members' Choice Award, voted on by the Workshop's members from the list of that year's entries; and a Lifetime Achievement Award. To be eligible, a book must be written by someone of Asian descent living in the United States and published first in English; entries are actively solicited by the Workshop.

List of winners
* = Member's Choice Award

1998
Mei-mei Berssenbrugge – Endocrinology 
Lois-Ann Yamanaka – Blu's Hanging

1999
Susan Choi – The Foreign Student
Arthur Sze – The Redshifting Web: Poems 1970–98

2000
Eric Gamalinda – Zero Gravity
Chang-rae Lee – A Gesture Life
Bino Realuyo* – Umbrella Country

2001
Ha Jin – The Bridegroom and Other Stories
Eugene Gloria – Drivers at the Short Time Motel: Poems
Akhil Sharma – An Obedient Father
Nick Carbo* – Secret Asian Man

2002
Alexander Chee – Edinburgh
Luis H. Francia – Eye of the Fish: A Personal Archipelago
Christina Chiu – Troublemaker and Other Saints
Don Lee* – Yellow

2003
Walter Lew – Treadwinds: Poems and Intermedia Texts
Meera Nair – Video: Stories
Julie Otsuka – When the Emperor was Divine
Ed Lin* – Waylaid

2004
Mei-mei Berssenbrugge – Nest
Monique Truong – The Book of Salt
Vijay Vaitheeswaran – Power to the People
Patrick Rosal* – Uprock, Headspin, Scramble and Dive

2005
Brian Leung 	World Famous Love Acts
Suketu Mehta – Maximum City: Bombay Lost and Found
Srikanth Reddy – Facts for Visitors
Ishle Yi Park* – The Temperature of this Water

2006
Jeff Chang – Can't Stop Won't Stop: A History of the Hip Hop Generation
Rattawut Lapcharoensap – Sightseeing
Shanxing Wang – Mad Science in Imperial City
Ed Bok Lee* – Real Karaoke People

2007
Linh Dinh – Borderless Bodies
Amitav Ghosh – Incendiary Circumstances: A Chronicle of the Turmoil of Our Times
Samrat Upadhyay – The Royal Ghosts
Gene Luen Yang* – American Born Chinese

2008
Mohsin Hamid – The Reluctant Fundamentalist
Vijay Prashad – The Darker Nations
Sun Yung Shin – Skirt Full of Black 
Ed Lin* – This Is a Bust

2009
Jhumpa Lahiri – Unaccustomed Earth
Sesshu Foster – World Ball Notebook
Leslie T. Chang – Factory Girls: From Village to City in a Changing China

2010
Paul Yoon – Once the Shore 
Minal Hajratwala – Leaving India: My Family's Journey From Five Villages to Five Continents
Ronaldo V. Wilson – Poems of the Black Object
Jason Koo* – Man on Extremely Small Island

2011
Yiyun Li – Gold Boy, Emerald Girl 
Kimiko Hahn – Toxic Flora
Amitava Kumar – A Foreigner Carrying in the Crook of His Arm, A Bomb
Ed Lin* – Snakes Can't Run: A Mystery
Karen Tei Yamashita* –  I Hotel

 2012
 Roya Hakakian – Assassins of the Turquoise Palace
 Rahul Mehta – Quarantine
 Janine Oshiro – Pier
 Thaddeus Rutkowski * – Haywire

Lifetime Achievement Award winners
2006: Maxine Hong Kingston
2008: David Henry Hwang 	
2009: Sonny Mehta

See also

Asian American literature
Chinese American literature
List of Asian American writers
List of American writers of Korean descent
Asian/Pacific American Awards for Literature

References

Asian-American literature
American literary awards
Awards established in 1998
1998 establishments in the United States
Literary awards honoring minority groups
Literary awards honoring lifetime achievement